Broadview Press is an independent academic publisher that focuses on the humanities. Founded in 1985 by Don LePan, the company now employs over 30 people, has over 800 titles in print, and publishes approximately 40 titles each year. Broadview's offices are located across Canada in Calgary, Peterborough, Nanaimo, Guelph and Wolfville.

History
In its early years, Broadview operated out of LePan's home in Peterborough, Ontario, publishing a small number of titles for both Trade and academic markets. With the publication of books such as The Broadview Anthology of Poetry, The Broadview Reader, and the first few titles in the Broadview Editions series in the early 1990s, Broadview began to focus exclusively on the academic market.

In May 2008 Broadview's social science and history lists were sold to the University of Toronto Press. Michael Harrison (Broadview Vice-President 1992-2004, and President 2005-2008) and several staff members went on to form the Higher Education division at that Press.  Broadview refocused on the core disciplines of English Studies and Philosophy, and Don LePan returned to the role of President and CEO. In 2013 Leslie Dema was appointed President; in the years since Dema has been responsible for most aspects of the company's operations (with LePan remaining CEO but increasingly focused on a limited number of anthology projects).

Publishing program

Broadview publishes anthologies, scholarly editions of literature and philosophy, works of criticism, and other academic books.

The publisher is perhaps best known for its publications in English Literature (see below), but it has also published notable titles in a number of other areas. A particular area of strength is undergraduate philosophy course texts; notable titles include Andrew Bailey's First Philosophy: Fundamental Problems and Readings in Philosophy, William Hughes, Jonathan Lavery & Katheryn Doran's Critical Thinking, and The Broadview Anthology of Social and Political Thought. The Broadview philosophy list also includes many titles intended both for an academic and for a general readership; notable examples include Robert Martin's There Are Two Errors in the  Title of This Book, Bernard Suits' The Grasshopper: Games, Life and Utopia, Brian Orend's The Morality of War, and Wendy Lynne Lee's Contemporary Feminist Theory and Activism.

The following academics are counted among the many highly respected authors on the Broadview list: Srivinas Aravamudan, Richard D. Altick, Janet Beer, Linda Bree, Allen Carlson, Thomas J. Collins, Brian Corman, Jeffrey N. Cox, Barbara C. Ewell, Kate Flint, Michael Gamer, Janet Giltrow, Thomas Hurka, Will Kymlicka, Elizabeth Langland, Roy Liuzza, Isobel Grundy, Gary Kelly, Jerome J. McGann, A.P. Martinich, Anne K. Mellor, Anne Lake Prescott, John Richetti, Tilottama Rajan, Peter Sabor, Geoffery Sill, Marjorie Stone, John Sutherland, James Tully, Daniel Vickers, Germaine Warkentin, and Susan Wolfson.

Broadview Editions series

The Broadview Editions series includes many titles long regarded as classics, as well as many valuable, lesser-known works. Each edition is newly edited, annotated, and includes an introduction, chronology, and bibliography. The series is distinguished by the inclusion of primary source documents contemporaneous with the work that help demonstrate the context out of which the work emerged. The inclusion of such materials was pioneered by D.L. Macdonald and Kathleen Scherf in their 1992 edition of Frankenstein; the inclusion of contextual materials soon became a feature of all titles in the series.

There are over 260 titles in the series, including acclaimed editions of canonical titles such as The Canterbury Tales; Jane Eyre and Groundwork for the Metaphysics of Morals. Editions of lesser-known authors such as British writers Eliza Haywood and Charlotte Smith, as well as American writers such as Leonora Sansay and Henry Fuller, are also highly regarded.

The series is published under the guidance of Broadview's Executive Editor, Marjorie Mather, and Production Manager, Tara Lowes; the Series Editor is Martin Boyne, who took over from Leonard Conolly in 2014. (Prof. Conolly, whose areas of scholarly interest include Shakespeare, Shaw, and Canadian theatre, is a former President of Trent University and a fellow of the Royal Society of Canada.)

The Broadview Anthology of British Literature

The Broadview Anthology of British Literature is a competitor to the long-established Norton Anthology of English Literature. The Broadview has acquired a strong reputation that in many ways parallels that of the Broadview Editions series; like the Broadview Editions, the anthology includes a wide range of contextual materials. It was first published in 2006 and it is widely used in British Literature survey courses.

The general editors of the anthology are: Joseph Black (University of Massachusetts), Leonard Conolly (Trent University), Kate Flint (Rutgers University), Isobel Grundy (University of Alberta), Don LePan (Broadview Press), Roy Liuzza (University of Tennessee), Jerome McGann (University of Virginia), Anne Prescott (Barnard College), Barry Qualls (Rutgers University), Claire Waters (University of California at Davis)

Freehand Books

Freehand Books was launched by Broadview in 2008 as a literary imprint, with a mandate to publish aesthetically diverse Canadian writing both by established authors and by new voices.

One of the titles published in Freehand's first season, Good To A Fault by Marina Endicott, won the Commonwealth Writers Prize Best Book Award, Canada and the Caribbean and was shortlisted for the Scotiabank Giller Prize.

References

External links 
 Broadview Press website
 Freehand Books website

Book publishing companies of Canada
Publishing companies established in 1985
1985 establishments in Ontario